A by-election was held for the New South Wales Legislative Assembly electorate of Coogee on 20 July 1974 because the Court of Disputed Returns overturned the result of the 1973 Coogee election. Ross Freeman (Liberal) had been declared elected by 8 votes over Michael Cleary (Labor). Justice Slattery in the Court of Disputed Returns held that 25 electors had been improperly deprived of a vote and declared that the election was void.

Dates

Results

The Court of Disputed Returns overturned the result of the 1973 Coogee election.

See also
Electoral results for the district of Coogee
List of New South Wales state by-elections

Notes

References

1974 elections in Australia
New South Wales state by-elections
1970s in New South Wales
July 1974 events in Australia